Chia may refer to:

Plants 
 Salvia hispanica, flowering plant in the sage family
 Chia seed, edible seeds of Salvia hispanica
 Salvia columbariae, an annual plant that is commonly called chia, chia sage, golden chia or desert chia
 Salvia polystachya, a herbaceous perennial plant native to Mexico, Guatemala and Panama

Places 
 Chía, Aragon, a municipality in Spain
 Chía, Cundinamarca, a town and municipality in Colombia
 Chia (Sardinia), a coastal area and village in Sardinia, Italy
 , a frazione in Soriano nel Cimino, central Italy

Personal names 
 Chia (surname), a surname in various cultures
 Xie (surname), a Chinese surname often spelled Chia in Singapore and Malaysia
 Jia (surname), a Chinese surname often spelled Chia in Taiwan or in the early 20th century
 A Spanish variant of the name Lucia

Other uses
 Chia (cryptocurrency), a proof-of-space-and-time (Storage provided over amount of time) cryptocurrency
 Chía (goddess), a deity in Muisca mythology
 Chia Pet, American figurines
 ChIA-PET, a molecular biological technique
 "Chia", a song by Four Tet from the album Rounds
 Chia Black Dragon, a series of dark fantasy novels by Stephen Marley
 Masala chai, called chia in Nepal